The Beijing Shejitan, also known as the Altar of Earth and Harvests or the Altar of Land and Grain, is a Confucian altar located in the Zhongshan Park in Beijing, China. Built in 1421 by the Ming dynasty, it was where national soil and grain ceremonies were conducted during the Ming and Qing dynasties. The Shejitan is also located in the opposite geometric location to the Imperial Ancestral Temple.  Along with the Imperial Ancestral Temple, the Temple of Agriculture, and the Temple of Heaven, it is one of Beijing's main imperial temples.

See also
 Taimiao (Imperial Ancestral Temple)
 Imperial City, Beijing
 Sajikdan, Seoul

References

Confucianism in China
Major National Historical and Cultural Sites in Beijing
Religious buildings and structures in Beijing